Deluxe - Dallas (formerly known as US Forms, USFI, USFI a business unit of Safeguard, and Deluxe Branded Marketing - Dallas) is a full–service print and promotional products company based in Dallas, Texas.  Deluxe - Dallas has regional sales offices in New York, Florida, Arizona, and Colorado.  Deluxe - Dallas serves over 2,600 clients in the hospitality and retail industries in the United States and in various countries worldwide.  Deluxe - Dallas is part of Deluxe Corporation which is headquartered in Shoreview, Minnesota.

Timeline

1984 – Faisal Ahmad leaves Burroughs Corp to start US Forms Inc., acquiring first account, Pearle Vision
1986 – Administrative assistant hired
1987 – Nancy Henger joins company, acquires Omega Optical account
1990 – Steven Sutor hired as Controller
1990 – David Porter joins as Marketing Representative and acquires PageMart and Sears Employee Credit Union accounts
1991 – Core competencies expand to enable becoming Omega's Agency of Record, producing Magazine ads and printed four–color work
1991 – Dedicated creative department established by Ed Angerstein
1993 – Tim VanCleave hired as ninth employee to generate new business – acquired Parkland Hospital account to significantly grow revenue
1993 – USFI recognized as one of Top 100 Fastest Growing Companies by SMU Cox School of Business
1995 – Steve Ealy hired to manage expansion of newly computerized creative department 	
1997 – USFI Gains GTE Directories, designs and produces directory covers nationwide as well as collateral
1997 – Steven Sutor moves from Controller position to build an IT department
2000 – USFI launches new cellular provider MetroPCS via print, web, in–store campaigns
2000 – USFI surpasses $10 million in annual sales, explores web marketing capabilities
2001 – Dedicated Hospitality Division is founded
2003 – Hospitality Reps expand to key markets nationwide, company legally changes name to USFI
2003 – Robert Lyman joins the company for technology business development and MetroPCS account service
2004 – First USFI Distribution Center is established
2006 – USFI surpasses $20 million in annual sales
2007 - Caryl Barrineau hired to develop business and sales operations.
2008 – Dan Zipes is hired to convert Distribution Center into Logistics and Supply Chain Division
2008 – USFI/GreenWorks is launched, a web–source of green products and information for hospitality, academic and other markets
2009 – USFI at 25 year mark receives full identity re–design and positioning
2011 – USFI hires Douglas Ritter as VP of Marketing and Business Development
2012 – USFI launches new e-commerce effort, Vertical Cubed, based on a Kentico platform
2012 – Faisal Ahmad, CEO and President of USFI passes away on Friday March 2
2012 – USFI names Douglas Ritter President of USFI on March 5
2012 - USFI launches new Health & Beauty division on March 10
2012 - USFI shuts down Vertical Cubed and outsources the Digital Design with a partner
2015 - Safeguard Business Acquisitions and Mergers (BAM), part of Deluxe Corporation, finalizes an asset purchase of USFI, now known as USFI, a business unit of Safeguard.
2019 - USFI rebrands as Deluxe Branded Marketing - Dallas.
2020 - Deluxe Corporation undergoes logo rebrand which is cascaded to Deluxe - Dallas.

External links

Advertising agencies of the United States